Woodside East is a census-designated place (CDP) in Kent County, Delaware, United States. It is part of the Dover, Delaware Metropolitan Statistical Area. The population was 2,316 at the 2010 census.

Geography
Woodside East is located at  (39.0675435, -75.5376242).

Demographics

As of the census of 2000, there were 2,174 people, 752 households, and 557 families residing in the CDP. The racial makeup of the CDP was 66.33% White, 28.24% African American, 0.55% Native American, 0.78% Asian, 0.05% Pacific Islander, 0.87% from other races, and 3.17% from two or more races. Hispanic or Latino of any race were 2.39% of the population.

There were 752 households, out of which 46.1% had children under the age of 18 living with them, 46.8% were married couples living together, 20.6% had a female householder with no husband present, and 25.8% were non-families. 18.9% of all households were made up of individuals, and 3.6% had someone living alone who was 65 years of age or older.  The average household size was 2.89 and the average family size was 3.28.

In the CDP, the population was spread out, with 34.7% under the age of 18, 9.2% from 18 to 24, 30.8% from 25 to 44, 18.5% from 45 to 64, and 6.7% who were 65 years of age or older.  The median age was 30 years. For every 100 females, there were 90.4 males.  For every 100 females age 18 and over, there were 86.5 males.

The median income for a household in the CDP was $32,431, and the median income for a family was $32,344. Males had a median income of $29,750 versus $19,865 for females. The per capita income for the CDP was $13,542.  About 15.0% of families and 16.1% of the population were below the poverty line, including 19.1% of those under age 18 and 6.8% of those age 65 or over.

Education
Most of Woodside East is located in the Caesar Rodney School District. Portions are zoned to Nellie Stokes Elementary School in Camden, while others are zoned to Star Hill Elementary School, in an unincorporated area, and to Frear Elementary School in Rising Sun-Lebanon. Stokes areas are zoned to Fifer Middle School in Camden while Star Hill and Frear areas are zoned to Postlethwait Middle School, in Rising Sun-Lebanon. Caesar Rodney High School in Camden is the comprehensive high school for the entire district.

Some of Woodside East is in the Lake Forest School District. That area's zoned high school is Lake Forest High School.

References

Census-designated places in Kent County, Delaware
Census-designated places in Delaware